Johannes Franciscus "Hans" Hoogervorst (born 19 April 1956) is a retired Dutch politician of the People's Party for Freedom and Democracy (VVD) and economist. He is the former chairman of the International Accounting Standards Board (IASB) from 1 July 2011 through 30 June 2021.

Hoogervorst attended a Gymnasium in Haarlem from June 1968 until June 1974 and applied at the University of Amsterdam in July 1974 majoring in Modern history and obtaining a Bachelor of Arts degree in June 1976 before graduating with a Master of Arts degree in July 1980. Hoogervorst applied at the Paul H. Nitze School of Advanced International Studies of the Johns Hopkins University in Baltimore, Maryland in March 1981 for a postgraduate education in International relations obtaining a Master of Arts degree in July 1983. Hoogervorst worked as a financial analyst at the National Bank of Washington (NBW) in Washington, D.C. from August 1983 until March 1986 and as a civil servant for the Ministry of Finance from March 1986 until September 1987. Hoogervorst worked as a political consultant for the People's Party for Freedom and Democracy from September 1987 until May 1994 and also as a speechwriter for the Leader of the People's Party for Freedom and Democracy Frits Bolkestein from April 1990 until May 1994.

Hoogervorst was elected as a Member of the House of Representatives after the election of 1994, taking office on 17 May 1994 serving as a frontbencher and spokesperson for Finances. After the election of 1998 Hoogervorst was appointed as State Secretary for Social Affairs and Employment in the Cabinet Kok II, taking office on 3 August 1998. The Cabinet Kok II resigned on 16 April 2002 following the conclusions of the NIOD report into the Srebrenica massacre during the Bosnian War and continued to serve in a demissionary capacity. After the election of 2002 Hoogervorst returned as a Member of the House of Representatives, taking office on 23 May 2002. Following the cabinet formation of 2002 Hoogervorst was appointed as Minister of Finance in the Cabinet Balkenende I, taking office on 22 July 2002. The Cabinet Balkenende I fell just four months later on 16 October 2002 and continued to serve in a demissionary capacity with Hoogervorst appointed as Minister of Economic Affairs dual serving in both positions. After the election of 2003 Hoogervorst again returned as a Member of the House of Representatives, taking office on 30 January 2003. Following the cabinet formation of 2003 Hoogervorst was appointed as Minister of Health, Welfare and Sport in the Cabinet Balkenende II, taking office on 27 May 2003. The Cabinet Balkenende II fell on 30 June 2006 and continued to serve in a demissionary capacity until it was replaced by the caretaker Cabinet Balkenende III with Hoogervorst remaining as Minister of Health, Welfare and Sport, taking office on 7 July 2006. In August 2006 Hoogervorst announced that he wouldn't stand for the election of 2006 but did serve as campaign manager for that election. The Cabinet Balkenende III was replaced by the Cabinet Balkenende IV following the cabinet formation of 2006 on 22 February 2007.

Hoogervorst semi-retired from national politics and became active in the public sector, in August 2007 he was nominated as chairman of the executive board of the Authority for the Financial Markets (AFM), taking office on 15 September 2007. In May 2008 Hoogervorst was nominated as vice chairman of the supervisory board of the International Organization of Securities Commissions (IOSCO), taking office on 29 May 2008. In June 2010 Hoogervorst was elected as chairman of the supervisory board of the International Organization of Securities Commissions, taking office on 9 June 2010. In June 2011 Hoogervorst was nominated as the chairman of the executive board of the International Accounting Standards Board (IASB), he resigned as chairman of the Authority for the Financial Markets and chairman of the International Organization of Securities Commissions the same day he was installed as chairman of the International Accounting Standards Board, taking office on 1 July 2011.

Biography

Early life
After completing his secondary education, he studied history at the University of Amsterdam, graduating in 1981. He then went on to obtain a Master of Arts degree in international relations from Johns Hopkins University SAIS in Washington, D.C. in 1983.

From 1983 to 1986 Hoogervorst worked as an international banking officer with the National Bank of Washington (Washington, D.C.) and from 1986 to 1987 as a policy officer for international monetary affairs at the Dutch Ministry of Finance. From 1988 to 1994 he was a policy assistant on finance to the People's Party for Freedom and Democracy (VVD) parliamentary party in the House of Representatives and from 1994 to 1998 a Member of Parliament.

Politics
From 3 August 1998 Hoogervorst was State Secretary for Social Affairs and Employment in the second Kok government. On 22 July 2002 he was appointed minister of finance in the first Balkenende government. From 16 October 2002 he was also responsible for the Dutch Ministry of Economic Affairs. On 27 May 2003 he was appointed Minister of Health, Welfare and Sports in the second Balkenende government. In this position, Hoogervorst introduced a basic health insurance policy, mandatory for all registered inhabitants, but executed by private insurers.

In 2007 Hoogervorst succeeded Arthur Docters van Leeuwen as director of AFM, the Dutch financial market supervisory organization.

On 1 July 2011 he became chairman of the IASB upon the retirement of Sir David Tweedie.

Hoogervorst is faced with many challenges as the new IASB chairman. For instance, countries such as the U.S. and Japan have not yet adopted IFRS.

Decorations

References

External links

Official
  Drs. J.F. (Hans) Hoogervorst MA Parlement & Politiek

 
 

 
 

1956 births
Living people
Dutch bankers
Dutch campaign managers
Dutch chief executives in the finance industry
Dutch corporate directors
Dutch expatriates in England
Dutch expatriates in Spain
Dutch expatriates in the United States
Dutch financial advisors
Dutch financial analysts
Dutch nonprofit directors
Dutch political consultants
Dutch political writers
Dutch speechwriters
Financial economists
Foreign policy writers
Grand Officers of the Order of Leopold II
International Accounting Standards Board members
International economists
Macroeconomists
Members of the House of Representatives (Netherlands)
Ministers of Economic Affairs of the Netherlands
Ministers of Finance of the Netherlands
Ministers of Health of the Netherlands
Ministers of Sport of the Netherlands
Monetary economists
Monetarists
Officers of the Order of Orange-Nassau
Paul H. Nitze School of Advanced International Studies alumni
Politicians from Haarlem
People's Party for Freedom and Democracy politicians
Public economists
State Secretaries for Social Affairs of the Netherlands
20th-century Dutch civil servants
20th-century Dutch businesspeople
20th-century Dutch economists
20th-century Dutch male writers
20th-century Dutch politicians
21st-century Dutch civil servants
21st-century Dutch businesspeople
21st-century Dutch economists
21st-century Dutch male writers
21st-century Dutch politicians